The Percy Group is a locality consisting of a number of islands (including the Percy Isles) in the Coral Sea within the Isaac Region, Queensland, Australia. The islands are uninhabitated as they are within national parks and conservation parks.

History 
The locality takes its name from the Percy Isles within the Northumberland Islands, which in turn was named in September 1802 by Matthew Flinders, commander of the sloop HMS Investigator, after the family name of the Dukes of Northumberland.

References

External links 

 

Isaac Region
Localities in Queensland